Kazuo Iwama (born January 1, 1951) is a Japanese computer scientist who works at Kyoto University. Topics in his research include stable marriage, quantum circuits, the Boolean satisfiability problem, and algorithms on graphs.

Education and career
Iwama earned bachelor's, master's, and doctoral degrees from Kyoto University in 1973, 1975, and 1980 respectively. He taught at Kyoto Sangyo University from 1978 to 1990, when he moved to Kyushu University. In 1997 he returned as a professor to Kyoto University. Currently he is working as a project professor.

Academic service
Iwama became the founding president of the Asian Association for Algorithms and Computation in 2007.
He was the founding editor-in-chief of the journal Algorithms, in 2008.
Since 2013 he has been editor-in-chief of the Bulletin of the European Association for Theoretical Computer Science.

Awards and honors
Iwama received an honorary doctorate from the University of Latvia in 2008, and was elected to the Academia Europaea in 2012.

Selected publications
.
.
.
.

References

External links
Home page

1951 births
Living people
Japanese computer scientists
Theoretical computer scientists
Kyoto University alumni
Academic staff of Kyushu University
Academic staff of Kyoto University
Members of Academia Europaea